Chetone isse is a moth of the family Erebidae. It was described by Jacob Hübner in 1831. It is found in Brazil.

References

Chetone
Moths described in 1831